Daniel Díaz Maynard (1933 – 22 March 2007) was an Uruguayan lawyer and  politician.

Political role

Maynard was a deputy representing the department of Montevideo,   from 1990 until 2005).

He was also an activist for human rights and worked to defend political prisoners and dissidents, many from neighbouring Argentina.

Political alignment

He was a member of the Broad Front political grouping supporting President Tabaré Vázquez, and had belonged to the Social Cristianos party, a branch of the Christian Democrats.

Death

He died in 2007. His remains are buried at the Central Cemetery of Montevideo.

See also

 Politics of Uruguay

References

External links
Obituary in Spanish
Obituary in Spanish

1930s births
2007 deaths
People from Montevideo
20th-century Uruguayan lawyers
Members of the Chamber of Representatives of Uruguay
Uruguayan people of British descent
Uruguayan people of Spanish descent
Place of birth missing
Broad Front (Uruguay) politicians
Christian Democratic Party of Uruguay politicians
Burials at the Central Cemetery of Montevideo